Bălăneşti may refer to several places:

Romania
 Bălănești, Gorj, a commune in Gorj County
 Bălăneşti, a village in Dealu Morii Commune, Bacău County
 Bălăneşti, a village in Podu Turcului Commune, Bacău County
 Bălăneşti, a village in Cozieni Commune, Buzău County
 Bălăneşti, a village in the town of Răcari, Dâmboviţa County
 Bălăneşti, a village in Bârgăuani Commune, Neamţ County
 Bălăneşti, a village in Mărunței Commune, Olt County
 Bălăneşti, a village in Gura Caliței Commune, Vrancea County

Moldova
 Bălănești, Nisporeni, a commune in Nisporeni district
 Bălănești Hill, the highest hill in the country